Joseph J. Straub  (January 19, 1858 – February 13, 1929) was a Major League Baseball catcher who played three seasons in the majors during the 19th century.

External links

1858 births
1929 deaths
Major League Baseball catchers
Major League Baseball players from Germany
19th-century baseball players
Troy Trojans players
Philadelphia Athletics (AA) players
Columbus Buckeyes players
Philadelphia Phillies (minor league) players
Milwaukee Brewers (minor league) players
Denver Mountain Lions players
Scranton Miners players
Binghamton Crickets (1880s) players
Denver Mountaineers players
Pueblo Ponies players